The Seacor Power was a , 265 Class liftboat, constructed in 2002, belonging to Seacor Marine and flagged in the United States. The ship was powered by two Caterpillar 3508B@1900hp engines.

Capsizing incident

Rescue attempts resulted in six successful rescues (one each by two United States Coast Guard (USCG) ships, and four by civilian vessels). The other 13 crew members are confirmed or presumed to have died. The search for survivors was called off by the Coast Guard on April 19, 2021.

The USCG cutter, Glen Harris  arrived within 30 minutes of the incident, despite its pre-commissioning status.

The National Weather Service said that a "wake low" weather pattern resulted in  winds, and very rough seas.

References

External links 

 

2002 ships
Ships of the United States
2021 in the United States
Maritime incidents in 2021
Ships built in Louisiana